Eric Miles (12 February 1899 – 8 August 1982) was a South African cricketer. He played in eleven first-class matches for Border from 1920/21 to 1929/30.

See also
 List of Border representative cricketers

References

External links
 

1899 births
1982 deaths
South African cricketers
Border cricketers